In Albania, vehicle registration plates are issued by the General Directory of Road Transport Services (DPSHTRR).

Current Vehicle Series

Private Vehicles

A new format similar to the post-1994 Italian and post-2009 French plate designs has been introduced since 16 February 2011.  The plates start with a blue strip at the left with 'AL' and redesigned double-headed eagle in white, 2 serial letters, security hologram, 3 digits, 2 serial letters on a rectangular white background, and end on the right with a blue strip that's supposed to show year of registration and regional code in white on. It has been observed that the last two identification elements are de facto not included while the font is more emphasized than the post-2002 one. Plates of all vehicles would experience a similar change. Critics claim that the color of the double headed eagle and strip is not representative of red and black colors of the Albanian flag.

Private vehicle license plates have black borders and black texts on a white background. They follow a format [AB 123 FG]. This format is national, irrespective of the vehicle's registered district.

Standard sized License Plate, 520 x 110 mm

2-Lined License Plate, 254 x 205 mm

Starting in 2022, license plates may also be issued in a smaller 360 x 100 mm format for the front and a 305 x 153 mm format for both front and rear plates. These are issued due to an increase of imports from Italy, Switzerland and the United States, which do not always issue EU-standard plates.

In Albania, "repetitive" license plates have red borders and texts on a white background. These are additional license plates to install, if there's an object such as a bike carrier rack blocking the original license plate of a private vehicle.

Standard sized License Plate, 520 x 110 mm

2-Lined License Plate, 254 x 205 mm

Agricultural vehicles
Agricultural vehicle registration plates in Albania have white borders and white texts on a green background. They follow the format [AA MB 00], where MB stands for Makinë Bujqësore which means Agricultural Vehicle.

Standard sized License Plate, 520 x 110 mm

2-Lined License Plate, 254 x 205 mm

Agricultural trailer registration plates in Albania have white borders and white texts on a green background. They follow the format [AA RB 00], where RB stands for Rimorkio Bujqësore which means Agricultural trailer.

Standard sized License Plate, 520 x 110 mm

2-Lined License Plate, 254 x 205 mm

Diplomatic Corps

Diplomatic corps vehicle registration plates in Albania have green borders and green texts on a white background. They do not have the blue strip on the right hand-side of the plate, unlike private vehicle registration plates. They follow the format [CD 00 00A], where CD stands for Corps Diplomatique. The first 2 digits of the license plate refer to the Diplomatic license plate codes (explained later in the article). For example code 01 belongs to the diplomatic corps of Austria whereas code 41 refers to the diplomatic corps of the European Union. Plate 01A belongs to the highest-ranking member of staff (usually the Ambassador) whereas all other plates are issued sequentially.

Standard sized License Plate, 520 x 110 mm

2-Lined License Plate, 254 x 205 mm

Diplomatic service vehicle registration plates in Albania have green borders and green texts on a white background. They do not have the blue strip on the right hand-side of the plate, unlike private vehicle registration plates. They follow the format [TR 00 00A], where TR stands for Truproje Diplomatike, which means "Diplomatic Bodyguards" in Albanian. The first 2 digits of the license plate refer to the Diplomatic license plate codes.

Standard sized License Plate, 520 x 110 mm

2-Lined License Plate, 254 x 205 mm

Honorary consul vehicle registration plates in Albania have green borders and green texts on a white background. They do not have the blue strip on the right hand-side of the plate, unlike private vehicle registration plates. They follow the format [HCC 00 0A], where HCC stands for Honorary Consul Corps. The first 2 digits of the license plate refer to the Diplomatic license plate codes.

Military Vehicles

Military Vehicle registration plates in Albania have green borders and green texts on a white background. They follow the format [MM 000PU], where MM stands for Ministria e Mbrojtjes which means Ministry of Defense. The last two digits can be the following combinations: 
 FA ( Forca Ajrore, Air Force)
 FD (Forca Detare, Naval Force)
 FT (Forca Tokësore, Land Force)
 KM (Komanda Mbështetëse, Support Command)
 PU (Policia Ushtarake, Military Police)
 SP (Shtabi i Përgjithshëm, General Staff)

2-Lined License Plate, 254 x 205 mm

Police Vehicles
Albanian Police Vehicle registration plates in Albania have blue borders and blue texts on a white background. They follow the format [MB 000 AA], where MB stands for Ministria e Brendshme which means Ministry of Interior. These plates are also issued to other subjects under the Ministry of the Interior, including the Republican Guard, which arranges transport for high-ranking members of state.

2-Lined License Plate, 254 x 205 mm

Taxis

Taxi registration plates in Albania have red borders and red texts on a yellow background. They follow the format [AA 000 T], where T stands for Taxi.

2-Lined License Plate, 254 x 205 mm

Technological Vehicles

Technological Vehicle registration plates in Albania have white borders and white texts on a green background. They follow the format [AA MT 00], where MT stands for Makinë Teknologjike which means Technological Vehicle.

Standard sized License Plate, 520 x 110 mm

2-Lined License Plate, 254 x 205 mm

Technological trailer registration plates in Albania have white borders and white texts on a green background. They follow the format [AA RT 00], where RT stands for Rimorkio Teknologjike which means Technological trailer.

Standard sized License Plate, 520 x 110 mm

2-Lined License Plate, 254 x 205 mm

Trailers
Trailer registration plates in Albania have white borders and white texts on a green background. They follow the format [AA R 000], where R stands for Rimorkio which means Trailer.

Standard sized License Plate, 520 x 110 mm

2-Lined License Plate, 254 x 205 mm

Test and Temporary Plates
Test Vehicle registration plates in Albania have red borders and red texts on a white background. They follow the format [AA 0 PROV], where PROV stands for Provë which means Test.

Standard sized License Plate, 520 x 110 mm

2-Lined License Plate, 254 x 205 mm

Temporary Vehicle registration plates in Albania have red borders and red texts on a white background. They follow the format [AA 0 PRK], where PRK stands for Përkohshme which means Temporary.
Standard sized License Plate, 520 x 110 mm

2-Lined License Plate, 254 x 205 mm

Current Motorcycle Series
Private motorcycles in Albania have a license plate format [AA 000]. Motorcycle registration plate in Albania have a size of 212 mm by 205 mm or 177 mm by 177 mm, and have black text and black boundaries on a white background.

Font Style
Albanian uses a unique font style on its license plates, a font style not used in any other jurisdiction. Below is a list of all characters and numbers in this font style

History

1958–1993 

During communism, plates of trucks would be painted upon on the sides with district name initials and a five digit serial number (in 1991 two digits followed with district name initials and three digits). State vehicles bared a white plate with the communist red star, district initials and serial number in black or white. Once private ownership was re-established after the fall of communism, a new format with standard size was introduced similar to the post 1993 model but with different font and missing national identification strip.

1993–2011 

The old 1993 format is still valid even though the new 2011 plates were introduced in February 2011. The old 1993 format was introduced around 1993 with the addition of the national identification strip (in 1995) on the left and a new bigger DIN 1451 font. Spacing between characters changed numerous times and a security hologram was added. The format starts with a two-letter abbreviation of an Albanian district name. For instance, the abbreviation for Korçë District is KO. A four-digit number follows with a serial letter indicating the order of allocation of each series of numbers. Thus, a plate ending in "B" will have been more recently released than one ending in "A" in the same district. Since 2002, a smaller font was introduced while plates with the older font are still valid.

The numbers and letters running on a Latin alphabet system show the number of vehicles registered in a district. If the last letter of a plate is "U", it means that a particular district has ~200 000 (two hundred thousand) registered cars.

District abbreviations

Diplomatic license plate codes

See also
 Transport in Albania
 Driving licence in Albania

References

 Kurjoziteti mbi targat e reja shqiptare Shquperia TV

External links

 License plates in Albania
 Old Albanian License Plates
 Drejtoria e Pergjithshme e Sherbimeve te Transportit Rrugor Website

Albania
Road transport in Albania
Albania transport-related lists